Jay Fisher is an American politician and agronomist serving as a member of the North Dakota House of Representatives from the 6th district. Elected in November 2018, he assumed office on December 1, 2018.

Early life and education 
Fisher is a native of Minot, North Dakota. He earned a Bachelor of Science and Master of Science in agronomy and crop science from North Dakota State University.

Career 
From 1994 to 2015, Fisher served as the director of the North Central Research Extension Center at North Dakota State University. Since 2016, he has worked as an agronomist for Fisher Research LLC. Fisher was elected to the North Dakota House of Representatives in November 2018 and assumed office on December 1, 2018.

References 

Living people
American agronomists
People from Minot, North Dakota
North Dakota State University alumni
Republican Party members of the North Dakota House of Representatives
North Dakota State University faculty
Year of birth missing (living people)